Bacchisa papuana is a species of beetle in the family Cerambycidae. It was described by Breuning in 1956.

Subspecies
 Bacchisa papuana basifloripennis Breuning, 1964
 Bacchisa papuana papuana Breuning, 1956

References

P
Beetles described in 1956